Malvinas is the Spanish name for the Falkland Islands, an archipelago in the south Atlantic Ocean which is a British Overseas Territory.

Malvinas, Malvinas Islands or Islas Malvinas may also refer to:

 Malvinas Islands (Chile), a group of islands in the General Carrera Lake, Chile
 Malvinas Day, a public holiday in Argentina
 Malvinas Current, an Atlantic current which is also known as the Falkland Current
 Estadio Islas Malvinas, home ground of Buenos Aires's All Boys club
 HMS Tiger Bay, a vessel of the Royal Navy until 1986, formerly PNA Islas Malvinas of the  Argentine Naval Prefectureas
 Las Malvinas Airport, an airport in Peru

See also

 Malvinas Argentinas Partido, Buenos Aires Province, Argentina
 Malvinas Argentinas, Córdoba, a municipality in Argentina
 "March of the Malvinas", an Argentine song composed in 1939
 Rosario – Islas Malvinas International Airport, Rosario, Argentina
 Malvina (disambiguation)
 Malvinas Argentinas (disambiguation)
 
 
 Falklands (disambiguation)